= Victoria Mixon =

A. Victoria Mixon
- Born: California
- Education: Cal Poly San Luis Obispo
- Occupation: Independent Fiction Editor
- Writing career
- Genre: Fiction Writing
- Website: victoriamixon.com

Victoria Mixon is an American independent fiction editor and writer. She was co-author of the first published book on introducing children to the Internet, and has written four books on the craft of writing fiction.

== Bibliography ==
=== Nonfiction ===
- Children and the Internet: A Zen Guide for Parents and Educators. Prentice Hall. 1996. ISBN 9780132446747.
- The Art & Craft of Writing Fiction: 1st Practitioner's Manual. La Favorita Press. 2010. ISBN 9780984542703.
- The Art & Craft of Writing Stories: 2nd Practitioner's Manual. La Favorita Press. 2011. ISBN 9780984542734.
- The Art & Craft of Writing: Secret Advice for Writers. La Favorita Press. 2015. ISBN 9781994227043.
- The Art & Craft of Writing: Favorite Advice for Writers. La Favorita Press. 2015. ISBN 9781994227050.
